Naoya Okane (岡根 直哉, born April 19, 1988) is a Japanese football player who playing as Centre-back and currently play for Okinawa SV.

Career statistics

Club
Updated to 20 February 2023.

Honours
 Okinawa SV
 Kyushu Soccer League: 2019, 2021, 2022

References

External links

Profile at FC Gifu
Profile at SC Sagamihara

1988 births
Living people
Waseda University alumni
Association football people from Osaka Prefecture
People from Kishiwada, Osaka
Japanese footballers
J1 League players
J2 League players
J3 League players
Japan Football League players
Shimizu S-Pulse players
Montedio Yamagata players
Tochigi SC players
FC Gifu players
SC Sagamihara players
Okinawa SV players
Association football defenders